Triady Fauzi Sidiq is an Indonesian swimmer who won a gold medal at the 2013 Southeast Asian Games and a bronze medal at the 2015 Southeast Asian Games in 50 metres freestyle. He currently holds Indonesian records in swimming in 50m, 100m and 200m freestyle; 200m butterfly; 200m individual medley; 4 × 100m freestyle relay; 4 × 200m freestyle relay; and 4 × 100m medley relay.

References

Indonesian male swimmers
Living people
Swimmers at the 2010 Asian Games
Swimmers at the 2014 Asian Games
Swimmers at the 2018 Asian Games
Southeast Asian Games medalists in swimming
Southeast Asian Games gold medalists for Indonesia
Southeast Asian Games bronze medalists for Indonesia
Competitors at the 2013 Southeast Asian Games
Competitors at the 2015 Southeast Asian Games
Competitors at the 2017 Southeast Asian Games
Asian Games competitors for Indonesia
Competitors at the 2011 Southeast Asian Games
Southeast Asian Games silver medalists for Indonesia
Competitors at the 2019 Southeast Asian Games
1991 births
Competitors at the 2021 Southeast Asian Games
20th-century Indonesian people
21st-century Indonesian people